Edward Gould Buffum (1820–1867) was born in Rhode Island to Arnold Buffum, a well known philanthropist in New England. His journalism career began with his work for the "New York Herald". However, when the Mexican–American War began in 1846, Buffum was forced to leave his post and move to California with his regiment. He arrived in San Francisco Bay as the Lieutenant of the 1st Regiment of New York Volunteers. After his discharge from the army in 1848, he decided to remain in California and try his hand at panning gold. These specific experiences were recorded in his book Six Months in the Gold Mine, published in 1850. He continued his journalism career in the West, becoming editor and chief of the "Alta California" newspaper, one of the first newspapers in California. He was very well respected in his community and was elected to the California State Assembly, serving in the session of 1855. When he returned to New England, he became a special correspondent for the "Herald". On this job, he traveled to Paris where he died on October 24, 1867 at the age of 41.

External links
 
Information on the California Gold Rush 
Passages From Buffum
California Legacy Radio Script featuring Buffum
E. Gould Buffum Biography
The Journal for the 1855 Session of the California State Assembly

1820 births
1867 deaths